Downfall is the fourth album by American doom metal band Solitude Aeturnus. It was re-released as a double CD together with Through the Darkest Hour.

Track listing
  "Phantoms"  (5:58)  
  "Only This (And Nothing More)" (5:25)  
  "Midnight Dreams"  (6:06)  
  "Together and Wither"  (5:37)  
  "Elysium"  (3:08)  
  "Deathwish"  (2:15) (Christian Death cover)
  "These Are the Nameless"  (5:24)  
  "Chapel of Burning"  (4:25)  
  "Concern"  (6:16)

Credits
Lyle Steadham – bass
John Covington – percussion
John Perez – guitars, tablas on "Elysium", piano on "Chapel of Burning"
Edgar Rivera – guitars, keyboards on "Phantoms" intro
Robert Lowe – all vocals, piano on "Phantoms" intro and "Chapel of Burning"

Production
Produced by Dave Osbourn and Solitude Aeturnus
Engineered by Dave Osbourn
Recorded 1995–1996 at Regal Studios, Dallas, Texas
Digital art by Breck Outland
Concept by Breck Outland and Count Lyle

Solitude Aeturnus albums
1996 albums
Massacre Records albums